Lovers and Other Relatives, also known as Peccato veniale and Venial Sin, is a 1974 Italian comedy film directed by Salvatore Samperi. It was shot in Forte dei Marmi.

Cast 
 Laura Antonelli: Laura 
 Orazio Orlando: Renzo 
 Alessandro Momo: Sandro 
 Monica Guerritore: Rosy 
 Lino Toffolo: il bagnino
 Tino Carraro: padre di Renzo
 Lilla Brignone: madre di Renzo 
 Dominique Boschero 
 Lino Banfi: il bagnino veneto
 Maurizio Mannocci: lo Smilzo

References

External links

1974 films
1970s sex comedy films
Commedia sexy all'italiana
Films directed by Salvatore Samperi
Italian coming-of-age films
Films scored by Fred Bongusto
1974 comedy films
1970s Italian films